Régis Pasquier (born 12 October 1945) is a French violinist from a family of musicians. His father Pierre Pasquier (1902–1986), a violist and his uncles Jean (1903), a violinist, and Étienne (1905–1997), a cellist, had founded a string trio, le Trio Pasquier. His brother Bruno Pasquier is a violist.

Biography 
Born in Fontainebleau, Régis Pasquier was a student of Zino Francescatti, with whom he latter recorded the Concerto for Two Violins by J.S. Bach. In 1958, he won the First Prizes in violin and chamber music at the Conservatoire de Paris. From 1977 to 1986, he was principal violin of the Orchestre National de France. In 1985, he was appointed professor of violin and chamber music at the Conservatoire de Paris, where he taught until 2011.

Since 1960, he has toured extensively abroad.

With his brother Bruno (violist and conductor) and cellist Roland Pidoux, he was for a while a member of a sought-after trio.

In 1988, he received the Charles Cros Prize, and in 1991 the title of "Soloist of the year" at the Victoires de la Musique.

The virtuoso often performs in his village of Montréal in Burgundy.

Discography 
 Carnival of the Animals Camille Saint-Saëns (1978)
 24 Caprices by Niccolò Paganini (1991).
 Complete Concertos for violin by Mozart (1994).
 Violin Concerto by Jean Sibelius (1995).
 Sonatas for violin and piano by Beethoven with Jean-Claude Pennetier (1997).
 Sextet No. 1 in B flat major Op.18 by Johannes Brahms with Raphaël Oleg (violin), Bruno Pasquier (viola), Jean Dupouy (viola), Roland Pidoux (cello) and Étienne Péclard (cello), Harmonia mundi 1982
 Chamber music by Maurice Ravel (2004).
 Trios élégiaques 1 & 2 by Sergei Rachmaninoff with the Pennetier-Pasquier-Pidoux Trio (2008)
 Concerto by Beethoven (2002) at 
 Concerto by Tchaikovsky (2003) at Saphir Production.

References

External links 
 Biography on France Musique
 Régis Pasquier on Discogs
 Régis Pasquier on Info concert.com
 Régis Pasquier - Tzigane Rhapsodie de Ravel on YouTube

People from Fontainebleau
1945 births
Living people
21st-century French male classical violinists
Conservatoire de Paris alumni
Academic staff of the Conservatoire de Paris
20th-century French male classical violinists
Commandeurs of the Ordre des Arts et des Lettres